Rebecca Catherine Marino (born December 16, 1990) is a Canadian professional tennis player. On 11 July 2011, she reached her highest WTA singles ranking of 38. Marino was awarded Female Player of the Year by Tennis Canada two times, in 2010 and 2011. She decided in late February 2013 to take an indefinite break from tennis. During her break, she studied English literature at the University of British Columbia and was part of the rowing team. She was also a certified Club Pro 1 coach at the UBC Tennis Centre. In October 2017, Marino announced her intention to return to the pro circuit but her comeback was delayed due to ITF administrative regulations. She was eligible to return at the end of January 2018 and won the title in her first tournament back, a $15k in Antalya.

Early life
Rebecca Marino was born in Toronto to Joe Marino, owner of the construction firm Marino General Contracting, and Catherine Hungerford. The family moved to Vancouver before she turned two. Her father was of Italian descent. Marino's uncle, George Hungerford, won gold for Canada at the 1964 Summer Olympics in rowing. She has a younger brother named Steven, who also competed in rowing at the University of California, Berkeley. At five, Marino's mother signed her up for badminton. Before long, a tennis coach convinced her to switch racquets and she started playing tennis at age 10. At only 14, she won Vancouver’s premier amateur tennis tournament, the Stanley Park Open, becoming the tournament’s youngest champion in 75 years. From August 2008 to April 2009, she trained in Davos, Switzerland with German coach Nina Nittinger. Later in 2009, she moved to Montreal to train at the National Training Centre.

Tennis career

2005–09: Early years
Marino played the first professional event of her career at the $25k in Vancouver in August 2005, losing in qualifying. In August 2006, she lost in the qualifying first round of the Rogers Cup as a wildcard. Marino won in August 2008 her first singles title at the $10k in Trecastagni and two in doubles, respectively, in Evansville, Indiana in July and in Southlake, Texas in October of the same year. In November 2008, she won her first WTA Tour main-draw match at the Challenge Bell as a qualifier, defeating Jill Craybas in the first round. She was defeated by Galina Voskoboeva in the second round. In September 2009 at the Challenge Bell, Marino reached the second round for the second straight year with a win over Lauren Albanese, but lost her next match to Julia Görges.

2010: Breakthrough
Marino played the first Grand Slam of her career at the US Open in August. After winning three qualifying matches to enter the main draw, she beat Ksenia Pervak to set up a second round clash with world No. 4, Venus Williams. She lost after a close first set which ended in a tiebreak. After the match, Venus said: "It seemed like every time I had an opening she came up with a big serve, so I guess I know what it is like now playing myself." Her next tournament was in Quebec City at the Challenge Bell in September where she beat fellow Canadian Heidi El Tabakh in the first round. Marino upset first seeded and world No. 14, Marion Bartoli, in straight sets in the second round, which was her first career win against a top-20 player. She lost her quarterfinal match against Bethanie Mattek-Sands. She then stayed in the province of Québec and played a $50k in Saguenay the following week. Marino made it to the final and defeated Alison Riske in three tough sets to win the tournament, the second singles title of her career. She won her second straight $50k two weeks later in Kansas City by defeating Edina Gallovits in the final. The next week, Marino won her third straight $50k in Troy where she defeated Ashley Weinhold. In November, she lost in the semifinals of the $50K in Toronto against Alizé Lim, stopping her winning streak at 18.

2011: First WTA final and career-high ranking of No. 38

At the Australian Open in January, Marino defeated Junri Namigata in the first round. She lost in the second round against sixth seed Francesca Schiavone with a score of 7–9 in the final set. In February, Marino reached her first WTA final at the event in Memphis, where she faced Magdaléna Rybáriková. She was forced to retire from the match after losing the first set because of an abdominal strain. Marino qualified for the Indian Wells Open in March, but lost in the first round to Ekaterina Makarova. Following her first round exit, Marino took part in the inaugural $100k Bahamas Women's Open. As the fourth seed, she defeated qualifier Sophie Ferguson in the first round, Pauline Parmentier, and another qualifier, Heather Watson to reach the semifinals, where she lost against fifth seeded Angelique Kerber. At the French Open in May, she won her first round match over Kateryna Bondarenko and her second round match against María José Martínez Sánchez. She lost against 13th seed Svetlana Kuznetsova in the third round, her best Grand Slam performance so far. The next month, she reached the second round for her fourth straight Grand Slam at Wimbledon where she lost to Roberta Vinci. At the US Open in August, Marino lost for the first time of her career in the first round of a Grand Slam to Gisela Dulko. In September, she reached the quarterfinals of the Challenge Bell for the second straight year after beating fellow Canadians Stéphanie Dubois and Aleksandra Wozniak in the first and second round, respectively, but lost to Michaëlla Krajicek. At the last tournament of her season, the Luxembourg Open in October, she surprised the second seed and No. 15 player in the world Anastasia Pavlyuchenkova in the first round which was the second win of her career over a top-20 player. She lost her second round match against qualifier Bibiane Schoofs.

2012–13: Breaks from tennis
In January 2012, Marino lost in the first round of the Australian Open to Gréta Arn. She took a break from tennis to deal with mental and physical fatigue from February 2012 to late August 2012. Marino made a comeback the second week of September 2012 at the $25k in Redding, California, losing in the second round to Sachie Ishizu. The next month, in only her fifth tournament since coming back, she defeated fellow Canadian Sharon Fichman to win the $25k in Rock Hill, South Carolina as a qualifier. She then lost a week later in the first round of the $50k Saguenay Challenger to Maria Sanchez, stopping her winning streak at eight matches. In November 2012, at the $50k Toronto Challenger, Marino was forced to retire in her second round match after suffering an abdominal strain. She was supposed to end her season the next week at the $75k event in Phoenix, but had to withdraw following her injury.

At the Australian Open in January 2013, her first Grand Slam championship since coming back, Marino made it to the main draw with her protected ranking of 115, but lost to Peng Shuai in the opening round. After playing some ITF and WTA tournaments, she decided in late February 2013 to take a second break from tennis with no timetable for her return.

2017–18: Return to competition
Marino started training again during the first week of September 2017 and decided to return to competition in October 2017, after being away from the game for nearly five years. She was scheduled to play the $60k Saguenay Challenger but her comeback was delayed by three months due to ITF administrative regulations. She returned at a $15k event in Antalya at the end of January 2018 and won the title in her first tournament back, not losing a set along the way. The next week, she won her second straight title at a $15k in Antalya, without losing a set once again. Again in Antalya the week after, she captured her third $15k event in a row. Playing her fourth straight tournament in Antalya, the first on clay, Marino lost her quarterfinal match, ending her winning-streak at 19 matches. At her next tournament in March, a $25k tournament in Kōfu, she reached the quarterfinals as a qualifier but was defeated by world No. 101, Luksika Kumkhum, in three sets. In April at the $25k in Osaka, she advanced to her fourth final of the season where she lost to Destanee Aiava.

2020–21: Hiatus and another comeback to the tour
Marino began the season using a protected ranking to gain entry into the qualifying tournament for the 2021 Australian Open, held in Dubai mid-January. She qualified for her first Grand Slam tournament in ten years, defeating Jaqueline Cristian, Viktoriya Tomova and Maryna Zanevska without dropping a set. She was granted direct entry into the Gippsland Trophy, one of three makeshift WTA lead-up tournaments created for the participants of the upcoming Australian Open, also held in Melbourne, however she lost in the first round to Jasmine Paolini.
Marino won her first-round match at the Australian Open defeating Kimberly Birrell 6–0, 7–6, but was defeated in the second round by Markéta Vondroušová 6–1, 7–5, despite serving for the second set up 5–3. She won her qualifying match against Mayo Hibi 6–4, 6–3 at the Phillip Island Trophy, another makeshift tournament created in light of the COVID-19 pandemic. In the first round, she beat Mona Barthel to set up a second-round meeting with fourth seeded Petra Martić.

2022: US Open third round
At the US Open, she reached the third round for the first time at this major and only a second time at a Grand Slam level defeating Daria Snigur. She lost to Zhang Shuai in the third round.

Performance timeline

Only main-draw results in WTA Tour, Grand Slam tournaments, Fed Cup/Billie Jean King Cup and Olympic Games are included in win–loss records.

Singles
Current after the 2023 Indian Wells Open.

Doubles

WTA career finals

Singles: 1 (runner-up)

WTA Challenger finals

Doubles: 1 (title)

ITF Circuit finals

Singles: 22 (13 titles, 9 runner–ups)

Doubles: 9 (3 titles, 6 runner–ups)

Head-to-head record
Marino's record against players who have been ranked in the top 10, with those who are active in boldface.
 statistics correct .

Awards
 2010 – Tennis Canada: Female Player of the Year
 2011 – Tennis Canada: Female Player of the Year

Notes

References

External links

 
 
 
 UBC Thunderbirds profile

1990 births
Living people
Canadian female tennis players
Canadian people of Italian descent
Racket sportspeople from British Columbia
Tennis players from Toronto
Sportspeople from Vancouver
Tennis players at the 2019 Pan American Games
Pan American Games competitors for Canada